Rockhampton–Yeppoon Road is a non-continuous  road route in the Rockhampton and Livingstone local government areas of Queensland, Australia. Most of the route is designated as State Route 4 (Regional) and Tourist Drive 10. It is a state-controlled regional road (number 196).

Route description
Starting as Fitzroy Street it runs north-east through the CBD and crosses the Fitzroy Bridge over the Fitzroy River. It enters  as Toft Street and reaches an intersection with Bridge Street, where it joins State Route 4 and Tourist Drive 10. From there it continues north-east as Queen Elizabeth Drive and Musgrave Street before entering  as Yaamba Road.

At an intersection it leaves the highway, turning north-east as Yeppoon Road and running between the same two localities.

It then runs between Hidden Valley and  until it reaches a roundabout intersection with Tanby Road, where it ends. Yeppoon Road continues east as State Route 4 and Tourist Drive 10.

Land use along the road is mainly rural, but with business and residential developments at each end.

Road condition
The road is fully sealed, with a small section of dual carriageway. The following projects aim to improve the condition of sections of this road.

Road train access to Rockhampton
The project for upgrading between  saleyards and the Rockhampton abattoirs to provide access for Type 1 Road Trains, funded by the Northern Australia Beef Roads Program, was completed by early 2021 at a total cost of $30 million.
 Capricorn Highway – from Saleyards Road at Gracemere to the Bruce Highway roundabout at Rochhampton.
 Bruce Highway – from the Capricorn Highway roundabout to the Yaamba Road intersection.
 Rockhampton–Yeppoon Road – from the Bruce Highway intersection south-west to the Emu Park Road intersection (.

Road duplication
In 2019 an $80 million program funded by the Roads of Strategic Importance (ROSI) program was announced as in the planning stage. The proposed work was duplication of a section of the road in Ironpot and Mulara.

Pavement strengthening
In 2021 a $5 million project funded from various sources was announced. The proposed work was pavement strengthening and resilience upgrades to a  section of road.

History

The Archer brothers established the Gracemere pastoral run in 1855, on land that included the present site of Rockhampton. They made use of the Fitzroy River for shipping supplies and produce, and built a woolshed on the river bank. They also played a role in coining the name "Rockhampton" for their riverside worksite. Permanent settlement at the town site began in 1856, and the town was proclaimed and surveyed in 1858. The region expanded quickly due to good available land and water. Land to the north of the river was opened for settlement in the late 1850s, and became the location of both large holdings and small farms. The locality of Parkhurst was the site of a large holding named Glenmore.

The first bridge across the Fitzroy River was opened in 1881, replacing a steam ferry.

A large pastoral run was established along the length of the Capricorn Coast in 1865. The town that is now Yeppoon was surveyed in 1872. It grew to support smaller farms that were set up in the district, producing fruit, cattle and wool. Sugar cane was also grown from 1893 to 1903. The road from Rockhampton was completed in the 1870s.

Major intersections
All distances are from Google Maps.

See also

 List of road routes in Queensland
 List of numbered roads in Queensland
 List of tourist drives in Queensland

Notes

References

Roads in Queensland